Firas Lahyani (born 16 July 1991) is a Tunisian basketball player for US Monastir and the Tunisian national team. He is nicknamed "Air Tunisia", because of his athletic style of play and dunking abilities.

Professional career
Lahyani started his career with Sfax RS.

In 2003, Lahyani signed with US Monastir. He won four consecutive national league titles with Monastir from 2019 to 2022. On 28 May, he scored a team-high 21 points on 6-9 shooting in the 2022 BAL Finals to help Monastir win its first-ever BAL championship.

In August 2022, he joined Smouha of the Egyptian Basketball Super League, ending his 9-year tenure at Monastir. He returned to Monastir ahead of the 2023 FIBA Intercontinental Cup, in February 2023.

National team career
Lahyani participated with the Tunisia national team at the AfroBasket 2017.

BAL career statistics

|-
|-
|style="text-align:left;"|2021
|style="text-align:left;"|Monastir
| 5 || 0 || 12.2 || .579 || .000 || .750 || 3.2 || 1.0 || 0.6 || 0.2 || 5.0
|-
|style="text-align:left;background:#afe6ba;"|2022†
|style="text-align:left;"|Monastir
| 8 || 8 || 24.7 || .614 || .308 || .667 || 6.3 || 2.3 || 0.5 || 0.5 || 12.5

Reference

1991 births
Living people
Tunisian men's basketball players
People from Sfax
Power forwards (basketball)
US Monastir basketball players
20th-century Tunisian people
21st-century Tunisian people

Smouha SC basketball players